Carlos Vitor da Costa Ressurreição (born 15 April 1985), known as Vitor Ressurreição or simply Vitor, is a Brazilian footballer who plays for PSTC as a goalkeeper.

Career statistics

Personal life

Ressurreição is a member of the Seventh-day Adventist Church and does not play on the Sabbath, having been baptized in the church denomination in December 2015.

References

External links

1985 births
Living people
Brazilian footballers
Association football goalkeepers
Campeonato Brasileiro Série B players
Campeonato Brasileiro Série C players
Campeonato Brasileiro Série D players
Londrina Esporte Clube players
Brazilian Seventh-day Adventists
Converts to Adventism
Footballers from Rio de Janeiro (city)